Amblyseius celsus is a species of mite in the family Phytoseiidae.

References

celsus
Articles created by Qbugbot
Animals described in 1997